= Só Risos (TV program) =

Brazilian television program

Só Risos it is a Brazilian television program that the program had its exhibition in 2017 by Rede Bandeirantes.
